Edward Matthews may refer to:

Edward Matthews (baritone) (1904–1954), opera singer
Edward Matthews (soldier) (1896–1997), Australian soldier
Edward Matthews (author) (1813–1892), Welsh Calvinistic Methodist minister and author
Edward Bennett Mathews (geologist), American geologist

See also
Eddie Mathews (1931–2001), baseball player
Ned Mathews (1918–2002), American football player
Edward Mathew (1729–1805), British Army officer